Can't Have Nothin' Nice is the third and final album recorded by Austin, Minnesota band the Gear Daddies.  It is a collection of new and live versions of previously released songs as well as new songs that had never been released on an album (though many had been played in concert).  It was released in 1992 on Crackpot Records.

Track listing
  Dream Vacation (about going to the Wisconsin Dells)
  Boys Will Be Boys 
  Stupid Boy 
  Spider Monkey 
  Bored and 19 
  My Maria (a cover of B. W. Stevenson  later covered by Brooks and Dunn)
  Drank So Much (Just Feel Stupid) 
  Get It Right Someday 
  African Killer Bees 
 Party Stomp 
 Cut Me Off 
 2-18 (U.S. Route 218 runs through Austin, Minnesota)
 Iguana Man 
 Wear Your Crown 
 Black Superman (a cover of the Johnny Wakelin[] song referring to Muhammad Ali)
 Chip and Dale 
 Color of Her Eyes 
 Little Red Corvette (a cover of fellow Minnesotan Prince)
 She's Happy 
 Blues Mary 
 Minnesota Polka 
 Strength
 African Killer Bees (reprise)

Gear Daddies albums
1991 compilation albums